Guaminí is the capital of Guaminí Partido in Buenos Aires Province, Argentina.

History
The area was first occupied by Europeans during the Conquest of the Desert. The first settlement in the location was founded on March 30, 1876 and called Santa María de Guaminí. On March 28, 1883 the settlement was officially founded with the name Guaminí.

External links

Populated places in Buenos Aires Province
Populated places established in 1876
1876 establishments in Argentina
Cities in Argentina
Argentina